The 2019 Seattle City Council election was held on November 5, 2019. Seven seats of the nine-member Seattle City Council were up for election. Four incumbent members of the city council did not run for reelection while the remaining three incumbents all won reelection.

Sally Bagshaw, Bruce Harrell, Rob Johnson, and Mike O'Brien all announced that they would not seek reelection to the city council. Andrew J. Lewis defeated Jim Pugel to succeed Bagshaw, Tammy Morales defeated Mark Solomon to succeed Harrell, Alex Pedersen defeated Shaun Scott to succeed Johnson, and Dan Strauss defeated Heidi Wills to succeed O'Brien. Incumbent councilors Lisa Herbold, Debora Juarez, and Kshama Sawant ran for and won reelection.

The amount of money spent during the campaign doubled from the 2015 election with Amazon spending $1.5 million to support multiple candidates, including Egan Orion against Sawant and Pedersen's campaign.

Background

The districts of the Seattle City Council were reorganized into geographic districts starting in the 2015 election instead of the previously used at-large districts. Forty-seven candidates ran in the 2015 city council election which was the most up to that point and more than the twenty-nine candidates who ran in the 1997 election. Over fifty candidates ran in the 2019 election.

Mayor Ed Murray did not seek reelection in the 2017 mayoral election which was won by Jenny Durkan. Murray resigned on September 13, 2017, and was replaced by Bruce Harrell as temporary mayor who was later replaced by Tim Burgess.

Campaign

District 1

Lisa Herbold, who had served on the city council since her election in 2015, announced on January 30, 2019, that she would run for reelection. Phil Tavel, an activist, launched his campaign on January 31. Brendan Kolding, a police officer, announced his campaign in January and during the campaign he was recommended for firing after an internal investigation by the Seattle Police Department determined that he lied about his mistreatment of another officer.

Herbold and Tavel placed first and second in the primary and Herbold defeated Tavel in the general election.

District 2

Tammy Morales, a member of the Democratic Socialists of America who had run in the 2015 election, announced on January 7, 2019, that she would run for a seat on the city council from the 2nd district. Harrell, who had served on the city council since his election in 2007, announced on January 8, that he would not seek reelection. Phyllis Porter, an educator and community organizer, announced her campaign on January 17. Christopher Peguero announced his campaign on January 21. Ari Hoffman, Matthew Perkins, and Mark Solomon also ran in the election.

Morales and Solomon placed first and second in the primary and Morales defeated Solomon in the general election.

District 3

Beto Yarce, a business owner, announced on November 29, 2018, that he would run for city council, but later dropped out on February 19, 2019. Kshama Sawant, who was first elected in the 2013 election and is the only Socialist Alternative member on the city council, filed to run for reelection on January 11, 2019, and launched her campaign on January 24, becoming the first incumbent city councilor to do so. Egan Orion, the head of the United States Chamber of Commerce in Capitol Hill, announced his campaign on April 2, in response to Yarce dropping out. Zachary DeWolf, a member of the Seattle School Board, announced on April 9, that he would run in the election. Pat Murakami, an activist, Ami Nguyen, a public defender, and Logan Bowers, a business owner, also ran.

Bowers filed a complaint against Sawant during the campaign allegeding that Sawant had used city fund and resources to be used by Socialist Alternative. Sawant and Orion placed first and second in the primary and Sawant defeated Orion in the general election. Orion conceded to Sawant on November 12. Sawant won despite receiving 37% of the vote in the primary which was the worst performance for a winning incumbent city councilor in a primary since Richard McIver won reelection after receiving 39% in the 2005 primary.

District 4

Rob Johnson announced that he would not seek reelection after having served one term on the city council stating that he had told his wife that he would only serve one term. Shaun Scott, a member of the Democratic Socialists of America who served as a delegate for Bernie Sanders, announced his campaign in an article for The Stranger. Alex Pedersen ran in the election and was the first candidate to qualify for democracy vouchers.

Pedersen and Scott placed first and second in the primary and Pedersen defeated Scott in the general election.

District 5

Ann Davison Sattler announced her campaign for city council on January 23, 2019. Debora Juarez, who was first elected in 2015, announced that she would seek reelection on January 25. Juarez and Sattler placed first and second in the primary and Juarez defeated Sattler in the general election.

District 6

Mike O'Brien, who was first elected in the 2009 election, announced on February 13, 2019, that he would not seek reelection. Dan Strauss, a policy advisor for Sally Bagshaw, announced his campaign on the same day as O'Brien's retirement announcement. Heidi Wills, who was one of three incumbents who lost reelection in the 2003 election after Strippergate, ran in the election.

Strauss and Wills placed first and second in the primary and Strauss defeated Wills in the general election.

District 7

Sally Bagshaw, who had served since her election to the city council in 2009, announced on November 27, 2018, that she would not seek reelection. Andrew J. Lewis announced his campaign for city council on November 28, 2018. Jim Pugel, the former chief of the Seattle Police Department, announced his campaign for city council on January 29, 2019. Naveed Jamali, a former spy, also ran in the election.

Lewis and Pugel placed first and second in the primary and Lewis defeated Pugel in the general election.

Campaign finance

$3,376,384 was spent in total during the 2015 election with $669,340 being from independent political action committee and $2,707,044 coming from contributions to candidates. Campaign spending increased during the 2019 election with $7,294,171 being spent in total with $1,427,737 coming from democracy vouchers, $1,819,300 being contributions to candidates, and $4,047,134 being from independent political action committees.

The Civic Alliance for Sound Economy, the political action committee of the Seattle Metropolitan United States Chamber of Commerce which received over $200,000 in funding from Amazon, supported and gave money to Tavel, Solomon, Orion, Pedersen, Juares, Fathi, Wills, Pugel, and George during the campaign. Amazon contributed over $1.5 million during the election which was more than the $130,000 donated by the company and its employees during the 2015 election.

Endorsements

District 1

District 2

District 3

District 4

District 5

District 6

District 7

Notes

References

2019 United States local elections
Seattle City Council
Seattle City Council 2019